The 1929–30 Kangaroo tour of Great Britain was the fourth Kangaroo tour, and took the Australia national rugby league team all around England and also into Wales. The tour featured the ninth Ashes series which comprised four Test matches and was won by Great Britain. The team sailed on the SS Orsova via the Panama Canal and played an exhibition game in New York before arriving in England.

Touring squad
A total of 28 footballers were selected to go on the tour: 13 from clubs of Sydney's NSWRFL Premiership, 4 from clubs of the Toowoomba Rugby League, 3 from clubs of the Brisbane Rugby League premiership, 3 from clubs of the Ipswich Rugby League and 5 from elsewhere in country New South Wales and Queensland. In Sydney on 24 July 1929, the day before the Kangaroos were to sail to England, Queensland's Tom Gorman was named captain of the squad. He was the first Queenslander to captain a touring Kangaroos side and would be the last until Wally Lewis in 1986. South Sydney's Arthur Hennessey joined the tour as non-playing coach, the first such appointment till Clive Churchill in 1959. The tour manager was Harry Sunderland.

The players were paid £4 10s per week from the time they left Sydney till they returned. The English and Australian Leagues agreed on strict rules prohibiting English clubs from signing the Australian players during the tour.

Matches

1st Test
In the tour matches leading up to the first Test, the Australian team had won 7 of their 8 games. The English team was weakened by the absence of their usual captain, Jonty Parkin (who was suffering from lower back pain), as well as Brough and Ellaby

Australia had scored four tries by half time. England's first try came 14 minutes into the second half. This was England captain Les Fairclough's last match against the Australians.

2nd Test
In response to their loss to the Australians in the previous Test, the British made several changes to their side for the 2nd Test.

England, with the help of Parkin closed the gap between themselves and the Australians, with Sullivan's goal kicking giving the home team a winning margin of 9–3.

3rd Test
England had held the Ashes for almost 20 years, and this match would decide whether they were to continue doing so.

It was a freezing afternoon for the deciding test, which Australia dominated yet was still unable to put points on the board. With only a few minutes remaining and the scores locked at nil-all in the third and deciding test, Australian halfback Joe "Chimpy" Busch collected the ball from a scrum win 30 metres out and scooted down the sideline. He crashed over the try-line in the corner with England's loose forward Fred Butters on his back making a last-ditch attempt to stop him. As the corner post went flying the crowd spilled onto the field in excitement. Referee Bob Robinson looked set to award Australia the try and the game (and with it the Ashes) when the touch-judge Albert Webster emerged through the crowd (which was overflowing and allowed on the pitch to avoid crowding) claiming Busch had taken out the corner post before grounding the ball. Even though Robinson believed it was a fair try he had no option other than to rule 'no try'. The referee was reported to have said to the Kangaroos "fair try Australia, but I am overruled", while England's captain Jonty Parkin shook Busch's hand and congratulated him before the touch-judge intervened. The match finished as a 0–0 draw, leaving the series tied at one match apiece.

For the remainder of his life (he died on 29 May 1999 at the age of 91), Busch insisted he scored the try, quoted as saying "I got it down all right…it was a fair try." The corner where Busch scored the disallowed try in Swinton, was in the following decades still officially known as Busch's Corner.

4th Test
After much deliberation the controversial decision was made to play a fourth Test a week later. This was the first and only time that a fourth test has been played on any Kangaroo tour.

In this match Cec Fifield broke his ankle and was unable to play the remainder of the tour. In an enthralling and especially brutal match, the deadlock was only broken by Stan Smith's solitary unconverted try so England won 3–0, to retain the Ashes.

Wales
This was the first rugby league international to be played at Wembley Stadium.

References

Australia national rugby league team tours
Rugby league tours of Great Britain
Kangaroo tour of Great Britain
Kangaroo tour of Great Britain
Kangaroo tour of Great Britain
Kangaroo tour of Great Britain
Kangaroo tour of Great Britain